The 1952–53 NBA season was the Nationals' 4th season in the NBA.

Regular season

Season standings

x – clinched playoff spot

Record vs. opponents

Game log

Playoffs

|- align="center" bgcolor="#ffcccc" 
| 1
| March 19
| Boston
| L 81–87
| Paul Seymour (18)
| —
| Onondaga War Memorial
| 0–1
|- align="center" bgcolor="#ffcccc" 
| 2
| March 21
| @ Boston
| L 105–111 (4OT)
| Red Rocha (19)
| George King (4)
| Boston Garden
| 0–2
|-

Player statistics

Awards and records
Dolph Schayes, All-NBA First Team

References

Syracuse
Philadelphia 76ers seasons